The Mausoleum of Helena is an ancient building in Rome, Italy, located  on the Via Casilina, corresponding to the 3rd mile of the ancient Via Labicana. It was built by the Roman emperor Constantine I between 326 and 330, originally as a tomb for himself, but later assigned to his mother, Helena, who died in 330.

History
The area where the mausoleum is located is part of a late-Roman complex of building known as Ad Duas Lauros, which, according to ancient sources, extended from the Porta Maggiore until the third mile of the ancient Via Labicana. They include the Catacombs of Marcellinus and Peter and the Palaeo-Christian basilica with the same name; of the latter, little remains today, as it was used as the base for the modern church of Santi Marcellino e Pietro ad Duas Lauros.

Access to the mausoleum and the catacombs is to the left of the church.

Before the construction of the mausoleum, the area was used as a cemetery of  the Equites singulares. This has been attested by numerous inscriptions mentioning the Equites at Ad Duas Lauros, although the exact location of the necropolis has not been discovered. It has been supposed that the necropolis was deliberately destroyed by Constantine as a revenge against the Equites who, in the battle of Ponte Milvio, sided with Maxentius against him.

After the death of Helena, Ad Duas Lauros was assigned to the Roman popes. The mausoleum was damaged by the use of its materials for other constructions. In the 8th century it became a defensive fortress. However, it continued to house Helena's tomb until the 11th century, when the sarcophagus was brought to the Lateran (currently it is in the Vatican Museum).

Lanzoni and Duchesne place in this area the town known as Subaugusta, whose name referred to the Augusta Helena, and which for a while formed a small diocese, four of whose bishops took part in synods held at Rome between 465 and 502. The see is included in the Catholic Church's list of titular sees.

Architecture
The building is on the circular plan, and is constituted by two cylinders, the upper one being of smaller diameter (internal diameter ).

Internally, the lower cylinder has an octagonal shape. At the vertexes are niches, alternatively  rectangular and semicircular; one of them housed the entrance. In correspondence with the niche, in the upper ring, were eight arcaded windows. In order to obtain a lighter dome, it included fragments of amphorae (such as in the Temple of Romulus or the Mausoleum of Villa Gordiani), which are now visible after the vault has collapsed. This led to the medieval name of the mausoleum, Torpignattara (Torre delle pignatte, meaning "Tower of the Vases"), today also used for the quarter which has grown around.

The rectangular niche facing the entrance most likely contained the sarcophagus of Helena, in red porphyry. The external walls of the sarcophagus are decorated with war scenes, as it was probably originally to be used for Helena's son, the emperor Constantine.

See also
 Sarcophagi of Helena and Constantina
 Catacombs of Marcellinus and Peter
 List of ancient monuments in Rome

References

Citations

Sources

External links

330 establishments
Buildings and structures completed in the 4th century
330s establishments in the Roman Empire
Ancient Roman buildings and structures in Rome
Helena
Rome Q. VII Prenestino-Labicano
Helena, mother of Constantine I